Gerald Porter (born 14 May 1968) is an Irish professional darts player.

Porter won the standby qualifiers for the 2006 BDO World Darts Championship and qualified when Raymond van Barneveld beat Göran Klemme in the 2005 Winmau World Masters final as Klemme would have taken Porter's place if he had won. He faced Martin Atkins in the first round and lost 3–0.

World Championship results

BDO
 2006: First round (lost to Martin Atkins 0–3) (sets)

References

External links
Profile and stats on Darts Database

1968 births
Living people
Irish darts players
People from Ballybofey
Sportspeople from County Donegal
British Darts Organisation players